Ruth Miller may refer to:
Ruth Kirk (c. 1923–2000), née Miller, New Zealand anti-abortion campaigner
Ruth Miller (artist) (1904–1978), American artist
Ruth Miller (poet) (1919–1969), South African poet
Ruth Miller (actress) (1903–1981), American actress
Ruth Miller (1990s actress) in Thinner

See also
Patsy Ruth Miller (1904–1995), American actress